Nick Sacrinty (June 10, 1924 – April 16, 2008) was an American football quarterback. Collegiately he played at Wake Forest from 1943 to 1946 and was inducted into the Wake Forest Sports Hall of Fame in 1982. He played for the Chicago Bears in 1947.

He died on April 16, 2008, in Eden, North Carolina, at age 83.

References

1924 births
2008 deaths
American football quarterbacks
Chicago Bears players
Wake Forest Demon Deacons football players
People from Reidsville, North Carolina
Players of American football from North Carolina